Mont-Joli Airport  is located  north northwest of Mont-Joli, Quebec, Canada. It is the only airport with scheduled service in the Bas-Saint-Laurent region.

History

World War II
In the summer of 1940 the Royal Canadian Air Force selected a flat area of farmland between Mont-Joli Station (on the Montreal-Halifax Canadian National Railway mainline) and the Saint Lawrence River for a military airfield. Construction on the aerodrome began in October 1941 and was completed by April 1942 at a cost of $200,000. Three paved runways and 50 buildings were constructed for what became known as RCAF Station Mont-Joli.

Inaugurated on April 15, 1942, RCAF Station Mont-Joli was a training base for the British Commonwealth Air Training Plan and hosted No. 9 Bombing and Gunnery School from 15 December 1941 until 14 April 1945. RCAF Station Mont-Joli was used by RCAF Eastern Air Command during the Battle of the St. Lawrence as a coastal patrol base; during 1942–1944, Canadian cargo ships and warships were sunk by German U-boats in an effort to close the Saint Lawrence Seaway off to shipping. Aircraft staging out of Mont-Joli were among those used to ward off U-boats and ensure the safety of shipping to the eastern tip of the Gaspé Peninsula at Cap-Gaspé.

Aerodrome information
 
The aerodrome was listed as with three runways as follows:

Post-war (1945–1995)
RCAF Station Mont-Joli was decommissioned by the air force in 1945 and became the property of the Department of Transport (now Transport Canada) on December 15, 1945 for use as a civilian airport.

Current (1995–present)
Its ownership was transferred again in 1995 to the "Régie intermunicipale de l’aéroport régional de Mont-Joli".

It is the busiest airport in eastern Quebec, though still very far from the Québec/Jean Lesage International Airport in Quebec City and Montréal-Pierre Elliott Trudeau International Airport in Montreal.

Sunwing Airlines started flying that aircraft type from Mont-Joli to Punta Cana in December 2017.

Air Canada indefinitely suspended its operations at Mont-Joli Airport in June 2020 due to the financial impact of the COVID-19 pandemic in Canada.

Airlines and destinations

References

External links

Airports of the British Commonwealth Air Training Plan
Mont-Joli
Mont-Joli
Certified airports in Bas-Saint-Laurent